Cue or CUE may refer to:

Event markers
Sensory cue, in perception (experimental psychology)
Cue (theatrical), the trigger for an action to be carried out at a specific time, in theatre or film
Cue (show control), the electronic rendering of the specific action(s) to be carried out at a specific time by a show control system
Voice cue, in dance, words or sounds that help match rhythmic patterns of steps with the music
Cue mark, in motion picture film to signal projectionists of reel changes
Cue, a vocal message given by a group fitness instructor to inform participants of upcoming sequences, such as a change in stretching direction

Music and audio
Cue (band), a Swedish musical group 
Cue tone, a message consisting of audio tones, used to prompt an action.
Cue (audio), to determine the desired initial playback point in a piece of recorded music
Cue sheet (computing), a metadata file that describes how the tracks of an audio track are laid out
Source cue, music that emanates from an element visible within a theatrical or movie scene, like a piano, jukebox or car radio
Musical cue, on sheet music helps ensemble musicians to coordinate their playing. It may also refer to a musical trigger for a theatrical cue

Places
Cue, Western Australia, a gold mining town 
, a village in Llanes, Asturias, Spain

Organizations
Catholic University in Erbil, Iraq
Chinju National University of Education, South Korea
Concordia University of Edmonton, Canada
Consumers United for Evidence-based Healthcare, United States
Cracow University of Economics, Poland

Other uses
Cue (clothing), an Australian clothing store chain
Cue (magazine), a former weekly magazine covering entertainment in New York City
Cue (search engine), a defunct website and app
Cue! (video game), Japanese mobile game
Cue stick, in billiard-type games
Cue bid, a type of bid in the card game contract bridge
"Cue" (among other spellings), a spelled-out name for the letter Q in the English alphabet
".cue", used in the filename of cue sheets, descriptor files for specifying the layout of CD or DVD tracks
Commercially useful enzymes
CUE Bus (City–University–Energysaver), the local bus system operated by the city of Fairfax, Virginia, United States
The circular unitary ensemble, in mathematics
Cueing (medicine), rehabilitation techniques for Parkinson's disease patients to improve walking
Cue Ball Cat, the 54th American Tom and Jerry cartoon directed by William Hanna and Joseph Barbera, released in 1950
Gabino Cué Monteagudo (born 1966), Mexican politician

See also
 
 
 Cue sheet (disambiguation)
 OnCue
 On Cue
 Q (disambiguation)
 Que (disambiguation)
 Queue (disambiguation)
 Trigger (disambiguation)
 Stimulus (disambiguation)